Antipatitis is a form of a Greek folk dance from Greek island Karpathos, Greece.

See also
Music of Greece
Greek dances

References
 Karpathos tradition

Greek dances
Dodecanese